The Tomb of Joshua, i.e. the burial site of the biblical figure Joshua, and that of his companion Caleb are, according to a Samaritan tradition noted in 1877, at Kifl Haris in the West Bank. Religious Jews also identify one of the mausolea at Kifl Haris with that of Joshua and thousands of them go there on pilgrimage on the annual commemoration of his death, 26th of Nisan on the Hebrew calendar.

History
The mausoleum at Kifl Haris seen by Jews as the Tomb of Joshua, is known to Muslims as the Maqam of Yusha' ibn Nun (مقام يوشع بن نون; Shrine of Joshua, son of Nun) and as the Maqam of the Servant of Salah ad-Din (Shrine of the Servant of Saladin). The current structure of the Shrine of Joshua is known to be an Islamic shrine built by Sultan Saladin, which contained on its wall an inscribed plaque stating that "Jawhar bin Abdullah is one of the servants of the shrine." About this man, Palestinian historian Murad Mustafa Dabbagh wrote in his work Biladuna Filastin (Our Country Palestine; 1965) that he performed the pilgrimage on behalf of his master, the martyr Najm al-Din Ayyub, son of Sultan Al-Adil I, and that the Hajj took place in the year 610 AH (1213/14 CE), which places him and the time the shrine was built during the Ayyubid period.

The shrine considered by Jews to be the tomb of Caleb is seen by Muslims to be the maqam of Prophet Dhu al-Kifl, from whom they consider the first part of the town's name to be derived.

The third holy structure in Kifl Haris, standing at some distance in the southwest of the town, is a large open shrine dedicated to Prophet Dhul-Nun, identified with Yunus (Jonah). Jews see in it the tomb of Nun, the father of Joshua.

Wafa Palestine News Agency reports that after the 1967 Six-Day War, the village shrines became a religious destination for Jews, with visits increasingly taking a political and Judaizing character.

Hebrew Bible
According to the biblical book bearing his name, Joshua died at the age of 110 and his burial site was in a location of his own inheritance at Timnath-serah, which is in the hill country of the Tribe of Ephraim, north of the mountain of Gaash. 

Timnath-serah, or Timnath-heres, has been identified by some with the Palestinian village of Kifl Hares, while many place it at Khirbet Tibnah.

Islam

There are many local Islamic traditions locating the tomb of "Nabi Yusha'" ('Prophet Joshua') at various sites in Turkey (Joshua's Hill in Istanbul), Israel (Al-Nabi Yusha'), Jordan (near As-Salt), Iran (Isfahan), Iraq (Baghdad), and Lebanon (Miniyeh).

References

Bibliography

Archaeological sites in the West Bank
Jewish pilgrimage sites
Joshua
Tourist attractions in the State of Palestine
Tombs in the State of Palestine
Joshua